Isokaze  was one of 19 s built for the Imperial Japanese Navy during the 1930s.

Design and description
The Kagerō class was an enlarged and improved version of the preceding . Their crew numbered 240 officers and enlisted men. The ships had two Kampon geared steam turbines, each driving one propeller shaft, using steam provided by three Kampon water-tube boilers.

The main armament of the Kagerō class consisted of six Type 3  guns in three twin-gun turrets, one superfiring pair aft and one turret forward of the superstructure. They were built with four Type 96  anti-aircraft guns in two twin-gun mounts, but more of these guns were added over the course of the war. The ships were also armed with eight  torpedo tubes for the oxygen-fueled Type 93 "Long Lance" torpedo in two quadruple traversing mounts; one reload was carried for each tube. Their anti-submarine weapons comprised 16 depth charges.

Career
On 7 April 1945, Isokaze escorted the battleship  from the Inland Sea on her Operation Ten-Go attack on the Allied forces on Okinawa. Of those on board, 20 were killed and the rest were rescued by other ships. Yamatos other escorts, including ,  and Yamato herself, were sunk afterwards, Asashimo losing all hands during the encounter.

Isokaze's wreckage was located in an underwater survey in May 2016, but the news was not made public until February 10, 2018.

Notes

References

External links
CombinedFleet.com: Kagero-class destroyers
CombinedFleet.com: Isokaze history

Kagerō-class destroyers
World War II destroyers of Japan
Destroyers sunk by aircraft
1939 ships
World War II shipwrecks in the East China Sea
Maritime incidents in April 1945
Ships sunk by US aircraft
Ships built by Sasebo Naval Arsenal